The Constitution of the Democratic Socialist Republic of Sri Lanka has been the constitution of the island nation of Sri Lanka since its original promulgation by the National State Assembly on 7 September 1978.  it has been formally amended 21 times.

It is Sri Lanka's second republican constitution, replacing the Sri Lankan Constitution of 1972, its third constitution since the country received independence within the British Commonwealth as the Dominion of Ceylon in 1948, and its fourth constitution overall.

Former constitutions of Sri Lanka

Donoughmore Constitution

Soulbury Constitution

Under the Soulbury Constitution which consisted of The Ceylon Independence Act, 1947 and The Ceylon (Constitution and Independence) Orders in Council 1947, Sri Lanka was then known as Ceylon. Minority rights were safeguarded by Article 29(2) of the Constitution. The Governor-General (The Representative of  the Monarch of Ceylon who was also the Monarch of the United Kingdom), the Senate and the House of Representatives exercised legislative power. The House of Representatives consisted of 101 Members, of which 95 were elected by universal suffrage and 6 were nominated by the Governor-General. That total number was increased to 151 by the 1959 Delimitation Commission and the term of the House was 5 years
The S. W. R. D. Bandaranaike Government set up a Joint Select Committee of the Senate and the House of Representatives to consider a revision of the Constitution on 10 January 1958 but the committee was unable to come to a final conclusion on account of the propagation of Parliament on 23 May 1959. A similar attempt by the Dudley Senanayake Government was failed due to such a propagation on 22 June 1968 too. The Senate consisted of 30 Members (elected 15 by the House and 15 by the Governor -General) was abolished on 2 October 1971.

Amendments
 29 of 1954 on 06.07.1954 to amend section 29(2) to enable enactment of Act Nos.35 & 36 of 1954
 35 of 1954 on 16.07.1954 to increase the number of Members to 105 for a specified period and to terminate the services of the then existing Delimitation Commissioners.
 36 of 1954 on 16.07.1954 to make provision for the election of Members of the House of Representatives to represent persons registered as citizens of Ceylon under the Indian and Pakistani Residents (Citizenship) Act No.3 of 1949.
 4 of 1959 on 06.02.1959 to appoint a Delimitation Commission; to amend section 47 regarding delegation of power to Parliamentary Secretaries and to repeal Act Nos. 35 &36 of 1954.
 71 of 1961 on 30.12.1961 to include "Election judge" under section 55.
 8 of 1964 on 12.03.1964 to place the post of Commissioner of Elections in the Constitution and to make financial provision to conduct elections.
 29 of 1970 on 18.11.1970 to permit public officers (other than those in specified categories) to contest elections, and to make them eligible to be elected or nominated to the Senate.
 36 of 1971 on 02.10.1971 to abolish the Senate.

Republican Constitution

Sirimavo Bandaranaike came to office as the world's first woman Prime Minister in May 1970. Her United Front Government used the parliament as a Constituent Assembly and drafted a new Republican Constitution. It was promulgated on 22 May 1972.  This Constitution provided for a unicameral legislature named the National State Assembly with a term of office of 6 years and Sovereignty was entirely vested in it. A nominal President with a term of office of 4 years was appointed as the Head of State by the Prime Minister, Head of the Cabinet of Ministers responsible to the National State assembly. Ceylon was replaced by republic of Sri Lanka (Resplendent Island). This constitution containing a declaration of fundamental rights and freedom was amended on 11 February 1975 to change the basis of delimitation of constituencies from 75,000 persons per electorate to 90,000 persons. J. R. Jayewardene who came to office in July 1977 with a five-sixths majority passed the second amendment to the 1972 Constitution on 4 October 1977, which made the presidency an executive post. Under its provisions, then Prime Minister Jayawardene automatically became the first Executive President of Sri Lanka on 4 February 1978.

Background to the 1978 Constitution

Before the 1977 general election the UNP had sought a mandate from the people to adopt a new constitution.  Accordingly, a select committee was appointed to consider the revision of the existing Constitution.

The new Constitution, promulgated on 7 September 1978, provided for a unicameral parliament and an Executive President.  The term of office of the president and the duration of parliament were both set at six years.  The new Constitution also introduced a form of multi-member proportional representation for elections to parliament, which was to consist of 196 members (subsequently increased to 225 by the Fourteenth Amendment to the Constitution).

The Constitution provided for an independent judiciary and guaranteed fundamental rights, providing for any aggrieved person to invoke the Supreme Court for any violation of their fundamental rights. The Constitution also provided for a Parliamentary Commissioner for Administration (Ombudsman) who could investigate public grievances against government institutions and state officers and give redress. It also introduced anti-defection laws, and referendums on certain bills and on issues of national importance.

Current Constitution

Provisions for amendment

Most provisions of the Constitution of Sri Lanka can be amended by a two-thirds majority in parliament. However, the amendment of certain basic features such as the clauses on language, religion, and reference to Sri Lanka as a unitary state require both a two-thirds majority and approval at a nationwide referendum.

Amendments to date

References

External links

Website of the Parliament of Sri Lanka — Constitution
Constitution of the Democratic Socialist Republic of Sri Lanka with Amendments incorporated up to the 19th Amendment

Government of Sri Lanka
Law of Sri Lanka